Romero is family of bullfighters from Ronda, Spain, dating back to the 18th century. The only other family with a comparable history in bullfighting are the Ordóñez, whose founder, Cayetano Ordóñez, "El Niño de la Palmas", was also from Ronda. 

Notable members of this family are:

Francisco Romero
Juan Romero (bullfighter)
José Romero (bullfighter)
Pedro Romero

See also
List of bullfighters

Spanish families
Spanish bullfighters